Ridgewood is a suburb of Uckfield in South East England.

Ridgewood is a village on the south of the Town of Uckfield in the South East of England. It is inland between the seaside towns of Eastbourne (20 miles) and Brighton (17 miles) and approximately 6 miles from the Ashdown Forest. The village which has the Uckfield Millennium Green; an area of 22 acres of countryside with an all-weather tree-lined path. The area used to provide the clay for the adjacent Sussex Pottery works, owned by Benjamin Wares which operated until 1970 producing bricks, tiles and other terracotta products. The history of the brickworks is commemorated in the names of the nearby Wares Road and The Potteries. Walking around the Uckfield Millennium Green a deep quarry can still be seen where clay was dug in the 20th century and brought by narrow gauge train up to the brickworks in what is now the Ridgewood Factory Estate.

In 2016, the population was 3680 making up approximately 24% of the Uckfield population of 15157.

Ridgewood is not a parish as it has no church but is a voting ward. It has one nursing home, (Copper Beech house (Bupa), It has two care centres for the disabled - The New Inn and Copper Beech Nursing Home. It has a Post Office (with adjoining shop) and two bus routes passing through it to Eastbourne via Hailsham and Brighton via Lewes to the south, and Uckfield, Crowborough and Tunbridge Wells to the North. There is one pub in the village - The Brickmakers Arms, and the Ridgewood Village Hall  which is used by community groups for events as well as polling. Adjacent to the hall is the recreation ground which is a green space adjoined by the Millennium Green, a children's play area and local allotments. The recreation ground and Village hall play host to Christmas and Summer fayres, a November firework display, Easter Bunny Hunts, Quiz nights, and Bingo afternoons.

Uckfield